Viriato or the Monument to Viriathus is an instance of public art in Zamora, Spain.

History and description 
The statue is a work by Eduardo Barrón cast in bronze in Rome at Nelli's foundry in 1883; it was later bought by the Spanish State.

The leading statue of the sculptural ensemble represents a standing and almost naked full-body figure of Viriathus, with his right arm extended in attitude of rallying his troops, while the left forearm holds a tunic and the left hand grabs a sheathed sword below the level of an abnormally long handle (creating a phallic perception from certain angles).

The statue stands 2-metre high and its bronze base reads  ("terror of the Romans"), an epithet for Viriathus attributed to the Orosius' chronicles. The granite block features a battering ram emerging from its front side, cast in bronze in 1903.

Failing to undergo a proper ceremony of inauguration, the monument was casually unveiled by transients on 12 January 1904.

The monument, with Viriathus' posture identified as performing a Roman (fascist) salute, was embraced by the Falange as an icon during the Francoist dictatorship.

References 
Citations

Bibliography
 
 

Monuments and memorials in Castile and León
Outdoor sculptures in Castile and León
Buildings and structures in Zamora, Spain
Bronze sculptures in Spain
Sculptures of men in Spain
Statues of military officers